Peter Deng (born 12 January 1993), is a Kenyan-born South Sudanese professional footballer who plays as a left back for Australian club Heidelberg United FC in the National Premier Leagues Victoria and the South Sudan national football team.

Personal life
Deng was born on  12 January 1993 into a family of South Sudanese refugees in Nairobi, Kenya. He, along with his family, were fleeing from the conflict in South Sudan and eventually resettled in Australia when he was 10 years old.

His younger brother, Thomas Deng, played as a central defender for Melbourne Victory in the A-League and for the Socceroos. Their mother has always been supportive of the brothers' football careers and drove them around Adelaide dropping them off for training and matches.

, Deng taught Physical Education at the Parkville Youth Justice Centre.

Club career
After playing unorganised football in Kenya before moving to Australia, Deng played club football in Adelaide, first at Adelaide Blue Eagles and later at Adelaide Olympic.

After the family moved to Victoria, he played half a season with Green Gully in the National Premier Leagues Victoria (NPLV) with his brother Thomas. He played for another NPLV club, Heidelberg United FC, in 2019, before moving to the Eastern Lions in 2020. 

 he plays for Whittlesea Ranges FC, having moved there in 2021.

International career
Deng was called up by South Sudan for their 2017 Africa Cup of Nations qualification match against Benin on 27 March 2016, which he started.

References

External links
 

Living people
1993 births
People with acquired South Sudanese citizenship
South Sudanese footballers
South Sudan international footballers
Australian soccer players
Association football defenders
National Premier Leagues players
Footballers from Nairobi
Australian people of South Sudanese descent
Sportspeople of South Sudanese descent
Sudanese emigrants to Australia
Association football fullbacks
FK Beograd (Australia) players